Anthony Peters (born December 31, 1990) is a Canadian professional ice hockey goaltender playing for HK Poprad of the Slovak Extraliga.

His elder brother Justin is also a goaltender.

Career statistics

Regular season

Awards and honors

References

External links
 

1990 births
Living people
Canadian ice hockey goaltenders
Ice hockey people from Ontario
Rochester Americans players
Charlotte Checkers (2010–) players
Kingston Frontenacs players
Saginaw Spirit players
Oshawa Generals players
Belleville Bulls players
Florida Everblades players
Cincinnati Cyclones players
Wilkes-Barre/Scranton Penguins players
Iserlohn Roosters players
Modo Hockey players
Graz 99ers players
HC Slovan Bratislava players
HK Poprad players
Canadian expatriate ice hockey players in the United States
Canadian expatriate ice hockey players in Germany
Canadian expatriate ice hockey players in Slovakia
Canadian expatriate ice hockey players in Sweden
Canadian expatriate ice hockey players in Austria
People from Huron County, Ontario